Howard Samuel Wilcox (June 24, 1889 – September 4, 1923) was an American racecar driver active in the formative years of auto racing.

Biography
He was born in Crawfordsville, Indiana on June 24, 1889.

Wilcox won the 1919 Indianapolis 500, leading the last 98 laps of the race after starting in the 2nd position.
In 1911 Howdy set the world beach racing speed record of 89.23 mph.
He died on September 4, 1923 at Altoona Speedway board track in Tyrone, Pennsylvania in a car crash. He was buried at Crown Hill Cemetery in Indianapolis. Wilcox's wife had died the year before. Wilcox's son, Howard Jr., founded the Little 500 bicycle race, which has been held at Indiana University annually since 1951.

Indy 500 results

References

External links
Howdy Wilcox at ChampCarStats.com
 

1889 births
1923 deaths
Indianapolis 500 drivers
Indianapolis 500 polesitters
Indianapolis 500 winners
Racing drivers who died while racing
Sports deaths in Pennsylvania
People from Crawfordsville, Indiana
Racing drivers from Indiana
AAA Championship Car drivers
Burials at Crown Hill Cemetery